The 2019–20 Mercer Bears women's basketball team represents Mercer University during the 2019–20 NCAA Division I women's basketball season. The Bears, led by tenth-year head coach Susie Gardner, play their home games at the Hawkins Arena as members of the Southern Conference (SoCon). They finished the season 7-22, 4–10 in the Southern Conference.

Roster

Schedule

 
|-
!colspan=9 style=| Non-conference regular season

|-
!colspan=9 style=| SoCon Regular Season

|-
!colspan=9 style=| SoCon Tournament

Rankings
2018–19 NCAA Division I women's basketball rankings

References

Mercer Bears women's basketball seasons
Mercer
Mercer Bears
Mercer Bears